Steve Davis Snooker is a sports simulation video game developed and published by CDS Software in 1984. The budget release published by Blue Ribbon Software reached the top of the UK charts in May 1988. Steve Davis Snooker simulates the cue sport snooker. Released under licence from 6-time Snooker World Champion, Steve Davis.

The game is the first to feature a license of a professional snooker player, with later Jimmy White creating the Cueball series.  CDS called the game the "ultimate successor" to their 1983 pool simulator, titled Pool. Davis would also be involved with the 1989 follow-up Steve Davis World Snooker, as well as 1996's Virtual Snooker.

Overview
Steve Davis Snooker allows players to play against themselves, or against a human opponent in either Snooker, or Pool. However, there is no opponent AI. The game could be controlled by either a Joypad or a Cursor and Keyboard control scheme. The game has two different modes, with a short game (a game of Ten-Red Snooker similar to power snooker), or long game, a game of traditional fifteen-red Snooker.

The Atari game's box art boasts that the game has a "trick shot edit mode", "accurate spin", and "friction factor."

Reception

Critical reception for the game was generally high, with Zzap! magazine scoring the Commodore 64 game at 79% commenting "Steve Davis Snooker is the best version of the sport I have ever seen on the 64, with its excellent approach and options helping make it so if you're a snooker fan or you want to try something different from your everyday shoot em up, then this makes a worthy and refreshing change." Commodore Format also mentioned the game in a review, scoring the game at 70% before stating that whilst Snooker was a "hideously dull game", the game was a "nice conversion."

Crash Magazine also reviewed the game for the ZX Spectrum, scoring the game at 77% saying "A very good, user-friendly simulation, which (possibly for the first time) really calls on skill." Sinclair User were also positive with the game, scoring the game at 7/10, but did cite the lack of a  mechanic in game as an oversight.

Commodore User gave the game 60%, commenting that the game's developer were "too ambitious this time", commenting on the game's downgrade in the port from the Commodore 64 to the Commodore 16. However "If you're a dedicated afficionado [sic] then Steve Davis will no doubt appeal to you."

Sequel
An updated version of the game would be released in 1989 for the Amiga and Atari ST, known as Steve Davis World Snooker. The game featured similar gameplay as that of the original, however, also included AI opponents, and improved graphical designs. The game also features additional modes, such as Eight-Ball and Nine-Ball Pool, with Billiards.

See also
Steve Davis
Steve Davis World Snooker

References

1984 video games
Amstrad CPC games
Atari 8-bit family games
CDS Software games
Commodore 16 and Plus/4 games
Commodore 64 games
Davis
Davis
Multiplayer and single-player video games
Pool video games
Sinclair QL games
Snooker video games
Video games based on real people
Video games developed in the United Kingdom
ZX Spectrum games